Cecilia Peck (born May 1, 1958) is an American film producer, director and actress. She is the only daughter of actor Gregory Peck and his second wife Veronique Passani.

Career
As an actress, Peck was nominated for the Golden Globe Award for The Portrait, in which she played the daughter of her father's character. She played the leading role in Torn Apart, and appeared in My Best Friend Is a Vampire.

Peck produced A Conversation with Gregory Peck, about her father, which premiered as a Special Selection in the 2000 Cannes Film Festival, and aired on TCM and PBS American Masters. She directed and produced the documentary short Justice For All, an examination of capital punishment, which was awarded the Silver Gavel Award. She was an associate producer on Defending Our Daughters, a non-fiction film about women's human rights for Lifetime Television, which was awarded the Voices of Courage Award by the Women's Refugee Committee.

Since 2008, Peck and her family have been presenting the Gregory Peck Award for Cinematic Excellence to actors and directors at the Dingle International Film Festival and, starting in 2014, at the San Diego International Film Festival. Peck has presented the award to Patrick Stewart, Keith Carradine and Laurence Fishburne.

Peck directed and produced Shut Up & Sing, about the backlash against the Dixie Chicks for opposing the Iraq War. The film premiered at the Toronto International Film Festival, won a Special Jury Prize at the Chicago Film Festival, Best Documentary at the Sydney, Aspen, and Woodstock Film Festivals, and was shortlisted for the 2007 Academy Awards.

Peck directed and produced the feature documentary Brave Miss World (Netflix), following Linor Abargil's fight for justice and mission to break the silence around rape. The film was nominated for the Emmy Award for Exceptional Merit In Documentary Filmmaking in 2014.

Peck's company, "Rocket Girl Productions", produces independent feature films and documentaries.

In 2018, Peck joined the board of directors of the San Diego International Film Festival.

In 2020, Peck directed Seduced: Inside the NXIVM Cult which follows India Oxenberg and other women who shared their experiences in NXIVM, a self-help organization located in Albany, New York. Prior to working on the documentary, Peck was targeted for recruitment by NXIVM. A previous co-worker had reached out to Peck to inform her of an incredible women's group and suggest she meet with Allison Mack, one of its leaders and recruiters. Peck never responded to the emails, and a year later, received an e-mail from the recruiter apologizing.

Personal life
Peck married writer Daniel Voll on September 8, 2001. They have two children. Their son Harper Daniel Peck, born in 1999, is named after Harper Lee. Their daughter Ondine Peck-Voll was born in 2002. Peck is the former sister-in-law of supermodel Cheryl Tiegs, and aunt of actor Ethan Peck. She holds dual citizenship in the US and France, and speaks French.

Filmography

Actress
1986: Dress Gray (TV)
1987: Wall Street
1988: Crime Story (Guest star, 2 episodes)
1988: My Best Friend Is a Vampire
1990: Torn Apart
1991: Ambition
1992: Tous mes maris (TV)
1993: Blue Flame
1993: The Portrait (TV)
1994: Killing Zoe
1994: Renegade (Guest star, 1 episode)
1995: French Exit
1997: Sous les pieds des femmes
2005: Havoc

Director
2006: Shut Up & Sing
2013: Brave Miss World
2020: Seduced: Inside the NXIVM Cult

Producer
1999: A Conversation With Gregory Peck
2002: The Hamptons (TV)
2006: Shut Up & Sing
2013 Brave Miss World

References

External links 
 

1958 births
Living people
Film producers from California
Actresses from California
Actresses from Los Angeles
American people of English descent
American people of French descent
American people of Irish descent
American people of Scottish descent
American women film producers
Princeton University alumni
21st-century American women